Holup is a surname. Notable people with the surname include:

 Joe Holup (1934–1998), American basketball player
 Wopo Holup (1937–2017), American artist

Hungarian-language surnames